Fomitiporia ivindoensis is a fungus in the family Hymenochaetaceae. It was first isolated from Sub-Saharan Africa, specifically in the Guineo-Congolian forest. It has a pileate basidiome, small basidiospores and an absence of setae. Morphological features that differentiate this species with F. nobilissima and F. gabonensis are its pileus' shape, pore surface color and diameter, as well as its ecology.

References

Further reading

Cloete, M., et al. "A novel Fomitiporia species associated with esca on grapevine in South Africa." Mycological progress 13.2 (2014): 303–311.
Zhou, Li-Wei, and Hui-Jun Xue. "Fomitiporia pentaphylacis and F. tenuitubus spp. nov.(Hymenochaetales, Basidiomycota) from Guangxi, southern China."Mycological progress 11.4 (2012): 907-913.
Amalfi, Mario, Gerardo Robledo, and Cony Decock. "Fomitiporia baccharidis comb. nov., a little known species from high elevation Andean forests and its affinities within the neotropical Fomitiporia lineages." Mycological Progress13.4 (2014): 1075–1087.

External links

Hymenochaetaceae
Fungi described in 2010
Fungi of Africa